Happiness and Surrounding Suburbs is the debut studio album by Australian indie pop band Ball Park Music, released in Australia and New Zealand on 9 September 2011 through Stop Start and EMI Music Australia. 

The album debuted at number 36 on the ARIA Albums Chart, and peaked at number 26 following the release of their self-titled sixth studio album.

The album was produced by Matt Redlich and spawned the singles "Sad Rude Future Dude", "Rich People Are Stupid", "It's Nice to Be Alive", "All I Want Is You" and "Literally Baby". The album also features "iFly" from Conquer the Town, Easy As Cake. 

At the 2011 J Awards, the album was nominated for Australian Album of the Year.

Recording and production
Happiness and Surrounding Suburbs contains material that had been written by the band's frontman Sam Cromack from the mid-2000s through to the album's release in 2011. A number of demos were recorded for the record with the track list resulting in 11 tracks. A further song – "Big Big Mess" – from a previous session was released during this period as a b-side for the physical version of "It's Nice To Be Alive".

The album was recorded in Brisbane with producer/engineer Matt Redlich between January and June 2011 in his home studio called Massive Studios. The band later said, "It was recorded in his parents basement in East Brisbane. He had a beautiful tape machine that made us sound a hundred bucks. We used to save our money until we had enough to go back to the studio and do another song. This meant the album was recorded in dribs and drabs over the course of about a year."

Critical response

The AU Review voted it at #2 for 2011.

Jody Macgregor at Rave Magazine gave it four-and-a-half stars and Album of the Week.

Triple J Magazine awarded it 8/10.

Track listing
All music and lyrics written by Sam Cromack:
"Literally Baby" – 2:47
"It's Nice to Be Alive" – 3:29 
"Sad Rude Future Dude" – 2:17
"All I Want Is You" – 3:29
"Rich People Are Stupid" – 2:15
"Alligator" – 4:36 
"Birds Down Basements" – 3:48 
"Shithaus" – 3:26 
"iFly" – 2:33 
"Glass Jar" – 2:46 
"Happy Healthy Citizen of the Developed World Blues" – 5:37

Personnel
Ball Park Music
 Sam Cromack – writing, vocals, guitar 
 Jennifer Boyce – vocals, bass guitar 
 Daniel Hanson – drums 
 Dean Hanson – guitar, vocals 
 Paul Furness – piano, synthesiser 

Technical
 Matt Redlich – production, engineering, mixing 
 William Bowden – mastering 

Artwork
 Polly Bass Boost – artwork

Charts

Release history

References

2011 debut albums
Ball Park Music albums
EMI Records albums